Chuma Sean Kenosi Faas (born 22 January 1990 in Port Elizabeth, South Africa) is a South African rugby union player, who most recently played with the . His regular position is scrum-half.

Rugby career

Schoolboy rugby

He represented Eastern Province at the premier South African high schools competition, the Under-18 Craven Week, on two occasions – at the 2007 tournament in Stellenbosch and the 2008 tournament in Pretoria. After the 2008 event, he was named in a 97-man South Africa Under-18 Elite squad, which was later whittled down to the South Africa Schools team and a South Africa Schools Academy team, which played each other in a warm-up match before the  versus  match in the 2008 Tri Nations Series. Faas was selected as the starting scrum-half for the South Africa Schools side, which ended pu losing the match 19–41 to the Academy team.

Golden Lions / UJ

After school, Faas moved to Johannesburg, where he joined the  academy. He started eight matches for the  team during the 2009 Under-19 Provincial Championship, scoring a try in their 29–23 victory over the s. He made just one appearance for the  team in 2010, coming on for the final few minutes in a match against .

He was then hampered by serious injuries, which resulted in his not playing rugby in any national competition between 2011 and 2014 and even led to his retiring from the sport. However, he made a return to action in 2015, when he played for university side  in the 2015 Varsity Cup. He made five starts and two appearances as a replacement in the competition, impressing in his first start against  to be awarded the man-of-the-match award in a 10–8 victory.

Eastern Province Kings

The team suffered serious financial problems at the end of the 2015 season, which saw a number of first team regulars leave the union and Faas was among a number of players that were drafted into the squad. He played just under an hour in a 14–37 defeat.

References

South African rugby union players
Living people
1990 births
Rugby union players from Port Elizabeth
Rugby union scrum-halves
Eastern Province Elephants players